Scrobipalpa amseli is a moth in the family Gelechiidae. It was described by Povolný in 1966. It is found in southern France and Spain.

The forewings are covered with greyish scales, without any other markings. The hindwings are somewhat paler shining greyish.

References

Scrobipalpa
Moths described in 1966